Toomes is a townland in County Louth, Ireland. 

Toomes is closely located to Louth which is home to the St Mochtas House, circa 500AD, and to St Mary's Abbey, Louth. Toomes is also at the heart of the so-called Patrick Kavanagh Country which covers the area around Inniskeen where Patrick Kavanagh was born. Many of his poems are set there.

As a townland Toomes is hardly remarkable would it not be for the fact that the Quinn Group applied in 2007 to build  a Natural Gas fired combined cycle gas turbine (CCGT) power station with an electrical output capacity of 450 megawatts, which would be one of the biggest power plants ever built in Ireland.

There is controversy with regards to permitting such a plant in a cultural important area that is zoned for farming and residential purposes and also with regard to the lack of public information given in the context of the Strategic Infrastructure Act 2006 (Fast Track) under which the application was filed.

In June 2008 the Quinn Group received permission for their development.

External links 
 Planning Documents by the Quinn Group
 Strategic Infrastructure Act 2006 Info on the An Bord Pleanála Website
 Planning and Development (Strategic Infrastructure) Bill 2006
 Patrick Kavanagh Country

Townlands of County Louth